The 2023 New Zealand Warriors season is the 29th in the club's history. They will compete in the National Rugby League's 2023 Telstra Premiership. The Captain Tohu Harris retains his club role for the 3rd consecutive season and Head Coach Andrew Webster joins to coach the club for the 2023 NRL Season.

Player Movement
These movements happened across the previous season, off-season and pre-season.

Gains

Losses

Pre-Season Challenge

Regular Season

2023 Squad

References

New Zealand Warriors seasons
New Zealand Warriors season
2023 NRL Women's season